Barbara Williams (born 1953) is a Canadian-American actress. Williams has starred in the 1984 Paramount film Thief of Hearts, the 1988 film Watchers and the 1992 film Oh, What a Night. She garnered a Genie Award nomination for Best Supporting Actress at the 21st Genie Awards for Love Come Down.

Early life
Williams was born in Vancouver Island, British Columbia, the daughter of Simone and Jack Williams, a tugboat skipper and logger. She is the widow of social and political activist Tom Hayden.

Filmography

Film

Television

References

External links
 

1953 births
Living people
Actresses from British Columbia
People from Vancouver Island
20th-century Canadian actresses
21st-century Canadian actresses
Canadian television actresses
Canadian film actresses
Canadian emigrants to the United States
Canadian expatriate actresses in the United States